Kava may refer to:

Plants
Piper hooglandii, endemic to Lord Howe Island, is locally known as "kava".
Piper methysticum, commonly known as kava, can be used to make a drink with sedative and anesthetic properties.

Communications
KIXD, a radio station (1480 AM) licensed to serve Pueblo, Colorado, United States, which held the call sign KAVA from 1998 to 2023

Culture
Kava culture, the cultures of western Oceania which consume kava
Kava Kava, a rock band and live dance act from Huddersfield, United Kingdom
 Kava Kava, a song by a progressive rock band Snovi

Geography
Káva, a village in Hungary
Kava, Iran, a village in Mazandaran Province, Iran
Kava, East Azerbaijan, a village in East Azerbaijan Province, Iran
Kava, Mali, a commune in the Ségou region of Mali
Kava (river), also known as Taui River

Mythology
Kaveh, a mythical figure in Iranian mythology

People
 Kava (surname)
 Kavas (surname)

Pharmacology
Kavalactone, a class of pharmacological chemicals derived from the kava plant 
Kavain, a kavalactone

See also

 Cava (disambiguation)
Kaja (name)